The Coalition Against COVID-19 (CACOVID) is a private sector-led organization in Nigeria established to assist the government in combating the Coronavirus disease in the country. It was launched on March 26, 2020, following an announcement made by the Governor of the Central Bank of Nigeria, Godwin Emefiele. The purpose of the relief fund is to "support the Federal government of Nigeria in containing the COVID-19 pandemic in Nigeria; to ensure patients get the care they need and frontline workers get essential supplies and equipments; and to accelerate efforts to provide tests and treatments. Major companies, including Dangote Group, Access Bank and MTN have donated to the CACOVID Relief Fund, in addition to several private organizations and individuals.

Members 
 Central Bank of Nigeria
 Aliko Dangote Foundation
 Dangote Group
 Access Bank
 Folorunsho Alakija - Famfa Oil Limited
 United Bank for Africa
 Guaranty Trust Bank
 Union Bank
 Zenith Bank
 Ecobank
 Keystone Bank Limited
 Rand Merchant Bank
 Heritage Bank
 Standard Chartered
 Coronation Merchant Bank
 Standard Bank
 FBN Merchant Bank
 First City Monument Bank
 First Bank
 Sterling Bank
 Wema Bank
 FSDH Merchant Bank
 Citibank
 Providus Bank Limited
 Polaris Bank Limited
 Titan Trust Bank
 Unity Bank
 IHS Towers of Strength
 All On Limited
 Emzor Pharmaceutical Company
 GBC Health
 Sun Group
 MTN
 Cummins
 Zircon Marine Limited
 Jubaili Brothers Limited
 Bhojsons Plc
 KPMG
 Maple Plastics
 Osayi Alile - ACT Foundation
 Femi Otedola - Amperion Limited
 BUA Group
 Globus Bank
 Multichoice
 Nigerian Breweries
 NOVA
 OLaniwun Ajayi LP
 Pacific Holding Company
 SIL
 SunTrust Bank Nigeria Limited
 DANA
 Channels Television
 Nestle
 UAC
 Tolaram Group
 Flour Mills of Nigeria
 Mike Adenuga Foundation
 Nigerian Deposit Insurance Corporation
 The Bank of Industry
 FrieslandCampina
 Africa Finance Corporation
 Fidelity Bank
 Bet9ja
 Consortium Limited
 Josepdam Port Services
 SystemSpecs
 Deeper Life Bible Church
 Adron Homes
 CWAY
 Greenwich Trust Limited
 PricewaterhouseCoopers
 Alpha and Jam
 This Day
 Arise News
 CNN

See also 
 COVID-19 pandemic in Nigeria
 COVID-19 pandemic in Africa

References

External links 
 CACOVID official website
 Optimising Diagnostic Capacity for COVID-19 Testing in Nigeria
 Medical Facilities in 6 Geo-Political Zones of Nigeria
 There is a time for everything in life
 Coalition plans relief packages for 1.7m households
 CACOVID orders supplies for 400,000 COVID-19 test kits to increase Nigeria’s testing capacity

COVID-19 pandemic in Nigeria
Disease outbreaks in Nigeria
Organizations based in Nigeria